Simon Olsson (born 14 September 1997) is a Swedish professional footballer who plays as a midfielder for Eredivisie club Heerenveen.

Club career
On 2 August 2022, Olsson signed a four-year deal with Heerenveen in the Netherlands.

References

External links 
 

1997 births
Sportspeople from Linköping
Footballers from Östergötland County
Living people
Swedish footballers
Association football midfielders
Sweden youth international footballers
IF Elfsborg players
SC Heerenveen players
Allsvenskan players
Swedish expatriate footballers
Expatriate footballers in the Netherlands
Swedish expatriate sportspeople in the Netherlands